Prša is a village and municipality in the Lučenec District in the Banská Bystrica Region of Slovakia.

External links
https://web.archive.org/web/20071116010355/http://www.statistics.sk/mosmis/eng/run.html

Villages and municipalities in Lučenec District